The New Urban Communities Authority is an Egyptian state owned enterprise (SOE) affiliated to the Ministry of Housing. Its headquarters are in Sheikh Zayed City in Greater Cairo. It was established in accordance with law No. 59/1979. NUCA is tasked with addressing housing issues in Egypt by developing new urban communities to redistribute the population of existing cities away from Egypt's Nile valley and delta, and into the desert in order to save agricultural land from being urbanized.

After four decades of working under a strict policy of desert development, NUCA's mandate was modified in 2018 allowing it to develop land and real estate projects on agricultural land and within existing cities.

NUCA's main role is master developer of the 2.3 million feddans (acres) of state-owned land under its jurisdiction, subdividing it and laying trunk infrastructure, as well as constructing water and wastewater treatment plants, buildings for public schools, hospitals and government agencies. Through its city development agencies (jihaz tanmiyat al-madina), it sells land parcels to individuals and real estate developers for residential and other purposes.

NUCA is also the regulator of the new urban communities under its jurisdiction. Its chairman, the Minister of Housing, Utilities and Urban Communities issues planning permits and oversees the communities, while the appointed city agency heads issue building permits and run the day-to-day affairs of functioning towns, as the new urban communities do not fall under regular local administration.

New communities

New Communities not under NUCA's administration:

New Galala City

References

External links
 Official website
 Land and real estate sale portal (Inaccessible in Egypt)
Defunct archived website 2005-2013

Government agencies of Egypt
Housing in Africa